Howie King (born 9 September 1969, in Dublin) is an Irish former soccer player.

King was a midfielder or forward who represented Shamrock Rovers, Bray Wanderers and Bohemian F.C. amongst others during his career in the League of Ireland. He was part of Limerick's 1993 League of Ireland Cup winning squad, scoring the first goal in a 2-0 victory over St. Patrick's Athletic, and signed for Bohs in the summer of that year.

He made his League of Ireland debut for Rovers against Athlone Town on the opening day of the 1988–89 League of Ireland Premier Division season on 4 September 1988. In his one season at Rovers he made 14 appearances scoring one goal against Cork City on 13 November 1988.

Honours
 League of Ireland Cup:
 Limerick FC - 1992/93

References

Living people
Republic of Ireland association footballers
League of Ireland players
Shamrock Rovers F.C. players
Bray Wanderers F.C. players
Limerick F.C. players
Bohemian F.C. players
Kilkenny City A.F.C. players
Lisburn Distillery F.C. players
NIFL Premiership players
1969 births
Home Farm F.C. players
Association footballers from County Dublin
Association football forwards